Thomaz Bellucci was the defending champion, but lost to Fabio Fognini in the quarterfinals.
Tommy Robredo won the title, defeating Santiago Giraldo 6–2, 2–6, 7–6(7–5), in the final.

Seeds

  David Nalbandian (second round)
  Juan Mónaco (first round)
  Thomaz Bellucci (quarterfinals)
  Juan Ignacio Chela (quarterfinals)
  Potito Starace (semifinals)
  Tommy Robredo (champion)
  Fabio Fognini (semifinals)
  Santiago Giraldo (final)

Draw

Finals

Top half

Bottom half

Qualifying

Seeds

Qualifiers

Draw

First qualifier

Second qualifier

Third qualifier

Fourth qualifier

References
 Main Draw
 Qualifying Draw

Movistar Open - Singles
2011 Singles